Love Me Like That is the debut album by Canadian country music artist Kira Isabella. It was released on October 2, 2012 via Sony Music Canada. Its first single, the title track, peaked at number 99 on the Billboard Canadian Hot 100. The album has produced four Top-20 singles on Canadian Country radio, including the No. 7-peaking "A Little More Work".

Track listing

References

2012 debut albums
Kira Isabella albums
Sony Music Canada albums
Albums recorded at Noble Street Studios